Bayview, or Hopkins-Bayview, is a neighborhood located in the Southeast District of Baltimore between the Pulaski industrial area (East) and Greektown (West).

The neighborhood is bounded by Lombard Street to the North, Kane Street to the East, Eastern Avenue to the South, and I-895 to the West.  Also included in this area is the Joseph Lee neighborhood. Historically, this neighborhood was referred to as "A to K" due to the alphabetical naming of the streets Anglesea, Bonsal, Cornwall, Drew, Elrino, Folcroft, Gusryan, Hornel, Imla, Joplin, and Kane.

Central to this neighborhood is the  Johns Hopkins Bayview Medical Center.  Also found on the campus are two branches of the National Institutes of Health, the National Institute on Aging and the National Institute on Drug Abuse.

Demographics
As of the census of 2000, there were 460 people living in the neighborhood. The racial makeup of Hopkins-Bayview was 55.4% White, 29.3% African American, 0.9% Native American, 10.9% Asian, 3.3% from other races, and 0.9% from two or more races. Hispanic or Latino of any race were 3.3% of the population.

There were 95 housing units in the neighborhood.  12.5% of the occupied housing units were owner-occupied. 3.2% of housing units were vacant.

27.4% of the population were employed, 0% were unemployed, and 72.6% were not in the labor force. The median household income was $28,750. About 9.1% of the population were below the poverty line.

See also
 List of Baltimore neighborhoods

References

External links

Southeast Community Development Corporation
Johns Hopkins Bayview Medical Campus
National Institute on Aging
National Institute on Drug Abuse

 
Neighborhoods in Baltimore
Southeast Baltimore